The 1973 California Angels season involved the Angels finishing fourth in the American League West with a record of 79 wins and 83 losses.

Offseason 
 November 28, 1972: Andy Messersmith and Ken McMullen were traded by the Angels to the Los Angeles Dodgers for Frank Robinson, Billy Grabarkewitz, Bill Singer, Mike Strahler, and Bobby Valentine.

Regular season 
1973 was an eventful season for Angels pitcher Nolan Ryan. On May 15, Ryan threw the first no-hitter of his career. On July 3, he struck out Sal Bando of the Oakland Athletics for the 1000th strikeout in his career. Twelve days later, Ryan threw a second no-hitter, becoming the fifth pitcher in major league history to throw two no-hitters in one season.

For the year, Ryan set what is, as of 2022, the post-1900 Major League Baseball record for most strikeouts in a season with 383, topping Sandy Koufax's 1965 mark by one. (The all-time record belongs to Matt Kilroy, who struck out 513 batters in 1886). In the process, he struck out at least 10 batters in 23 different games.

Season standings

Record vs. opponents

Notable transactions 
 May 20, 1973: Jim Spencer and Lloyd Allen were traded by the Angels to the Texas Rangers for Mike Epstein, Rich Hand and Rick Stelmaszek.
 June 5, 1973: Brian Kingman was drafted by the Angels in the 12th round of the 1973 Major League Baseball draft, but did not sign.
 July 16, 1973: Curt Motton was released by the Angels.

Roster

Player stats

Batting

Starters by position 
Note: Pos = Position; G = Games played; AB = At bats; H = Hits; Avg. = Batting average; HR = Home runs; RBI = Runs batted in

Other batters 
Note: G = Games played; AB = At bats; H = Hits; Avg. = Batting average; HR = Home runs; RBI = Runs batted in

Pitching

Starting pitchers 
Note: G = Games pitched; IP = Innings pitched; W = Wins; L = Losses; ERA = Earned run average; SO = Strikeouts

Other pitchers 
Note: G = Games pitched; IP = Innings pitched; W = Wins; L = Losses; ERA = Earned run average; SO = Strikeouts

Relief pitchers 
Note: G = Games pitched; W = Wins; L = Losses; SV = Saves; ERA = Earned run average; SO = Strikeouts

Farm system

Notes

References 

1973 California Angels team at Baseball-Reference
1973 California Angels team page at www.baseball-almanac.com

Los Angeles Angels seasons
California Angels season
Los